Irving Chernev (January 29, 1900 – September 29, 1981) was a chess player and prolific Russian-American chess author. He was born in Pryluky in the Russian Empire (now in Ukraine) and emigrated to the United States in 1905. Chernev was a national master-strength player and was devoted to chess. He wrote that he "probably read more about chess, and played more games than any man in history."

Chernev's deep love for the game is obvious to any reader of his books. Chess historian Edward Winter commented:
Although Chess Notes items have shown that he sometimes cut corners, he was active at a time when writing and scholarship were not regarded as a natural pairing and when anecdotes and other chestnuts were particularly prevalent. Few were interested in sources. Above all, in the pre-digital age the work of writers in his field was far harder; they could not fill in gaps in their knowledge with press-of-a-button 'research'. …

 Chernev's output — clear, humorous and easy-going — gave the impression of effortlessness, but much industry lay behind it all. …

 Although his prose was often conversational, it was literate and carefully structured, bearing no resemblance to the ultra-casual 'I'm-just-one-of-the-lads' stuff increasingly seen in chess books and magazines since his time. We have also been struck by the scarcity of typographical errors in Chernev's writing throughout his life.

He wrote 20 chess books, among them: Chessboard Magic!, The Bright Side of Chess, The Fireside Book of Chess (with Fred Reinfeld), The Most Instructive Games of Chess Ever Played, 1000 Best Short Games of Chess, Practical Chess Endings, Combinations:  The Heart of Chess, and Capablanca's Best Chess Endings, the last of these being highly regarded by Edward Winter:

Published by the Oxford University Press in 1978 and reprinted by Dover in 1982, Capablanca's Best Chess Endings by Irving Chernev presents (in full algebraic notation) sixty complete games, annotated with emphasis on the final phase. Well over half are absent from the Golombek volume, a fact which underscores not only the inadequacy of Golombek's selection but also Chernev's readiness to embrace newly-found material. Written with deceptive casualness, Capablanca's Best Chess Endings was, perhaps, Chernev's finest book, combining hard analytical work and his customary screwball levity. Only Chernev could write annotations like (page 169) '“Don't simplify against Capablanca!”, I keep telling them at the office'.

In 1945, he and Kenneth Harkness wrote An Invitation to Chess, which became one of the most successful chess books ever written, with sales reaching six figures. Perhaps his most famous book is Logical Chess: Move by Move, first released in 1957. This takes 33 classic games from 1889 to 1952, played by masters such as Capablanca, Alekhine, and Tarrasch, and explains them in an instructive manner. An algebraic notation version was published by Batsford in 1998, with minor alterations to the original text. Chernev died in San Francisco in 1981. He was survived by his wife, Selma Kulik, and their son Melvin Chernev.

Books
Chess Strategy and Tactics (with Fred Reinfeld); Black Knight 1933
Curious Chess Facts; Black Knight 1937
Chessboard Magic!; Chess Review 1943
An Invitation to Chess (with Kenneth Harkness); Simon & Schuster 1945
Winning Chess Traps; Chess Review 1946
The Russians Play Chess; McKay 1947
The Bright Side of Chess; McKay 1948
Winning Chess (with Fred Reinfeld); Simon & Schuster 1948
The Fireside Book of Chess (with Fred Reinfeld); Simon & Schuster 1949
1000 Best Short Games of Chess; Simon & Schuster 1955
Logical Chess: Move by Move; Simon & Schuster 1957
Combinations: The Heart of Chess; Crowell 1960
Practical Chess Endings; Simon & Schuster 1961
The Most Instructive Games of Chess Ever Played; Simon & Schuster 1965
The Chess Companion; Simon & Schuster 1968
Chess in an Hour (with Frank J. Marshall); Sentinel 1968
Wonders and Curiosities of Chess; Dover 1974
The Golden Dozen (later renamed Twelve Great Chess Players and Their Best Games); Oxford 1976
Capablanca's Best Chess Endings; Oxford 1978
The Compleat Draughts Player; Oxford 1981
200 Brilliant Endgames; Simon & Schuster 1989

Notes

External links

1900 births
1981 deaths
Russian chess players
American chess players
Jewish chess players
American chess writers
20th-century American non-fiction writers
20th-century American male writers
American male non-fiction writers
20th-century chess players
Soviet emigrants to the United States